Eben Dönges High School (Hoërskool Eben Dönges) is a government-funded high school in Kraaifontein, Western Cape, South Africa.

Founded

It was established in 1961.

Name

The school is named after Theophilus Ebenhaezer Dönges, who was a politician and minister.

Language and gender

Afrikaans and English teaching take place here. Boys and girls are accommodated.

Alumni

Dann-Jacques Mouton, movie and television actor

Facilities

In a 2000 government survey, the school was cited as having good road access, on-site telecommunications and computers, adequate change rooms for its learners, toilets, science labs, two netball courts, two fields for both soccer and rugby  and an athletics track field nearby. In 2005 it had 851 students and 32 teachers. In 2006, 15 new computers were supplied by the Khanya project of the Western Cape Education Department, bringing the total to 75.

References

Schools in Cape Town
Afrikaans-language schools